is a Japanese actor and singer.

Early life

Takahashi was born as the eldest son in Akasaka, Minato, Tokyo. He has four stepbrothers, including the musician, Yuma Abe. Growing up, Takahashi took care of his younger siblings when they were young. In childhood, Takahashi’s grandmother convinced him to take various lessons to bring him out of his shell, but he did not last long with any of them. He joined a children's theatre group and was moved by his grandmother's delight to see him perform in their regular shows. 

Takahashi had been estranged from his mother, who had married three times, for about ten years. He finally reconciled with her a week before her passing in 2015.

Takahashi enjoys and is good at skateboarding, basketball, guitar, and harmonica.

His favourite comedians include FUJIWARA and Takayuki Haranishi. 

On March 7, 2017, he opened his Instagram account. On May 10, 2017, he closed his Instagram account.

Filmography

TV series

Films

Anime

Japanese dub
Live-action

Animation

Awards

References

External links
My Promortion profile 
Gekidan Tobiraza profile 

1980 births
Living people
Horikoshi High School alumni
Japanese male film actors
Japanese male child actors
Japanese male television actors
20th-century Japanese male actors
21st-century Japanese male actors
Male actors from Tokyo